The 1998 Western Athletic Conference men's basketball tournament was held March 3–7 at the Thomas & Mack Center at the University of Nevada, Las Vegas in Paradise, Nevada.

Hosts  upset New Mexico in the championship game, 56–51, to clinch their first WAC men's tournament championship.

The Rebels, in turn, received an automatic bid to the 1998 NCAA tournament. They were joined in the tournament by three other WAC members, New Mexico, TCU, and Utah, who all earned at-large bids. Utah, who was also the WAC regular season champion, ultimately went on to the national championship game, losing to Kentucky, while knocking off San Francisco, Arkansas, West Virginia, Arizona, and North Carolina on their way to title game.

Format
No changes were made to the tournament format from the 1997 tournament. Teams were again seeded based on their position within either the Mountain or Pacific Division (top six teams only).

Bracket

References

WAC men's basketball tournament
Tournament
WAC men's basketball tournament
WAC men's basketball tournament